Tyner, also called Center Hill, is an unincorporated community in Chowan County, North Carolina, United States, located approximately   from Elizabeth City and  about  from Virginia Beach, Virginia.

References

Unincorporated communities in Chowan County, North Carolina
Unincorporated communities in North Carolina